The Centro direzionale is a business district in Naples, Italy, close to the station of Napoli Centrale, they constitute an entire citadel. Designed by the Japanese architect Kenzō Tange, the entire complex was completed in 1995. It is the first cluster of skyscrapers to have been built in Italy or southern Europe.

History 
The project of the Centro direzionale dates back to 1964. It was designed in 1982 by Japanese architect Kenzo Tange.

After numerous projects, none of which were finally approved, in 1982 everything was entrusted to the famous Japanese architect Kenzō Tange. About three years after the presentation of his project, the construction work started.

The construction of the skyscrapers was entrusted to internationally renowned architects: among others, Renzo Piano designed the Olivetti building, Massimo Pica Ciamarra, flanked by a team of qualified architects, took care of the two ENEL towers, and Nicola Pagliara designed the towers of the Banco di Napoli as well as the Palazzo dell'Edilres.

The realization was carried out by the company Mededil S.p.A., IRI-Italstat group.

Structure 
The structure is characterized by the wide road axis at the centre of the complex on which there are piazza of various shapes (circular, quadrangular, etc.) and dimensions, some of which are equipped with fountains.

Below this main street there are numerous parking lots, escalators and road arteries serving the traffic connecting the most peripheral part of the architectural complex with the city centre.

The Telecom Italia Tower at 129 metres in height, is the tallest building in southern Italy, and the ninth tallest building in Italy. For 15 years, from 1995 to 2010 it was the tallest building in Italy, exceeding by 2 metres the Pirellone of Milan.

Seen from the Vomero hill, the entire complex appears in marked contrast to the antiquities of the historic centre of Naples and with Vesuvius in the background.

Inside there is the underground train station of Naples on the Circumvesuviana line: Centro Direzionale della Circumvesuviana. A further stop is under construction, of the metro line 1: the Centro Direzionale station.

The management center also houses the new headquarters of the Faculty of Engineering and Science and Technology of the University of Naples "Parthenope".

The center is one of the most extensive and important city works built in recent decades. Inspired by the ideas of Le Corbusier, represents a first positive example of clear separation between underground car traffic and surface pedestrian area.

The whole complex gives a note of renewal and modernity to the city, revitalizing the skyline and representing, to date, one of the most extensive and impressive urban agglomerations of skyscrapers in southern Europe.

The whole area has become an attractive nucleus towards companies that can effectively interface with each other in a single complex structure dedicated to them.

Location 

The complex is located in Naples between the central station, Vicaria side, and Piazza Nazionale. Although the structure is entirely within the Poggioreale district, there is a Polizia di Stato station called "Vasto - Arenaccia".

The center is accessible from Via Giovanni Porzio, a road that runs from Corso Malta to Corso Meridionale, making a corner with this and Via Taddeo da Sessa: this is the main entrance to the citadel, so much so that the most used address for the correspondence is "via Giovanni Porzio, 4", although this house number seems to be arbitrary, since it is not marked anywhere and before the office building on the same side of the street there is nothing, since the center itself is directly next to via Taddeo da Sessa, extension of the Southern course, from which another access ramp is available, through an underpass.

Access is also are available from via Francesco Lauria, via Domenico Aulisio, via Costantino Grimaldi, piazza Giovanni Falcone and Paolo Borsellino (formerly piazza Enrico Cenni, resulting again in the street map of the City of Naples despite the change of the plate [4]), via Serafino Biscardi and Piazza Salerno. Some of these entrances enter directly into the structures of the new courthouse.

Internal toponymy 
Inside the business district, most of the buildings are marked by a code consisting of a letter and a number, sometimes separated by a slash: the letter indicates the block, the number is the lot inside that block. The blocks range from A to G. For some buildings, names are used instead.

The center is also equipped with an internal odonomastic, without civic numbering. The exception is Kagoshima, which is the only name indicated by the Commune's official license plate, which curiously is shown in the street map of the same municipality, but not in the maps, including Google's.

Complex 

The ENEL Towers are often referred to as the Twin Towers of Naples due to their similarity.

Gallery

See also 
 List of tallest buildings in Naples

References

External links
 Official website

20th-century establishments in Italy
Buildings and structures in Naples
Zones of Naples
Kenzo Tange buildings